Rami Maymon is an Israeli artist.

Biography 
Rami Maymon studied in Bezalel Academy of Art and Design from 1995 till 1999. He received a Bachelor of Fine Arts in 1999. Maymon participated in Bezalel Post Graduate Program of Art in Tel Aviv from 2001 till 2003. Rami Maymon lives and works in Tel Aviv.

Exhibitions

Solo 
 1999 "State of Emergency", Bezalel Academy, Jerusalem.
 2002 "Back in a Minute", The Artists Studios Gallery, Tel Aviv.
 2002 "Private Collection 1", Hamidrasha Gallery, Beit Berl.
 2003 "Private Collection 2", The Post Graduate Program of Art, Bezalel Academy, Tel Aviv.
 2004 "Home & Away", Tal Esther Gallery, Tel Aviv.
 2005 "The Pollinator", Bjcem-XII Biennial of Contemporary Art, Naples, Italy.
 2007 "The Diver & The Bee", Noga Gallery of Art, Tel Aviv.
 2008 "Sunset", Installation at the IltisBunker, Kiel, Germany.
 2010 "Living Room", Helena Rubinstein Pavilion, Tel Aviv Museum of Art.
 2011 "White Night", Hinterhof space, Basel, Switzerland.
 2012 "Untitled (Dora Maar)", A Video installation at Shpilman Institute, The 2nd International Photography Festival, Jaffa.
 2013 "Further Reading", The Photography Gallery, Hamidrasha School of Art.
 2014 "Rudin Prize" Norton Museum of Art, West Palm Beach, Florida.
 2014 “Merhav” video installation at Hezi Cohen Gallery. 
 2014 "Nystagmus" project, Munich Volkstheater, Germany.
 2015 "Further Reading", Tel Aviv Museum of Art.
 2015 "Phonetic Transcription", Hezi Cohen Gallery, Tel Aviv.

Group 
Rami Maymon participated in group exhibitions around the world, including Museum of Contemporary Art Shanghai, Herzliya Museum of Contemporary Art, Ein Harod Museum of Art, Ashdod Museum of Art, Beit-HaGefen Arab Jewish Culture Center, Nahum Gutman Museum of Art, International Photography Festival (Israel), the photography gallery at Bezalel Academy of Arts and Design, Israeli National Maritime Museum, Umm al-Fahm Art Gallery. One of the exhibitions, he participated was a controversial group show at the ancient Roman place in the Old City of Jerusalem,  aiming to bring art to this part of the city.

Awards 
 2014 'Rudin Prize for Emerging Photography'. Norton Museum of Art.
 2015 Israeli Ministry of Science and Culture Prize for excellence in photography.

References 

Year of birth missing (living people)
Israeli artists
Living people